Deno is a peak in the eastern part of the Rila Mountain in southwestern Bulgaria. It is 2,790 m high and is the fourth highest summit in the mountain range behind Musala (2,925 m), Malka Musala (2,902 m) and Irechek (2,852 m). It is built up of gneiss and granite–gneiss. The northern slope is steep, while the southern one is oblique and covered in grass. A deep gully descends along the north-western slopes that holds perennial firn. To the west is situated the valley of the Musala Bistritsa, a tributary of Bulgaria's longest river, the Iskar and Musala refuge; to the north-east is situated the Saragyol Cirque that contains three glacial lakes. Deno is located in the vicinity of the ski runs of Borovets and the cabin lift to Yastrebots refuge, which make it easily accessible. In winter some of the tourist tracks are exposed to avalanches.

Citations

References 
 
 

Mountains of Rila
Landforms of Sofia Province
Two-thousanders of Bulgaria